Vicente Gómez (8 July 1911 – 23 December 2001) was a Spanish guitarist and composer.

Biography
Gómez was born in Madrid, where he learned his trade in a tavern owned by his father, located in the red-light district of Madrid. He worked there until he was 25 when he visited Russia. He was involved in politics and opposed to General Franco. He visited Cuba and Mexico, and he was discovered while making a radio show in Mexico.

He worked in New York and toured South America. In 1943, he became a U.S. citizen and served in the American army. In 1950 he performed in the Cary Grant film "Crisis" as guitarist Cariago in an uncredited performance. In the 1950s, he composed for Hollywood films, then retired to compose and teach. Gómez' students included Ricky Nelson and the wife of Omar Bradley.

Musical compositions

Original theme for guitar and orchestra, soundtrack for the film Blood and Sand (1941), played by the composer himself.

"Verde luna" (Green Moon), rumba Bolero, also featured in Blood and Sand. It was recorded by Alfredo Antonini and his orchestra featuring Victoria Cordova and John Serry Sr. in 1949. and also recorded by the Italian accordionist Beppe Junior in 2003 for his album Liscioterapia (Europlay, CD 0189).

Legacy
The archives of Vicente Gomez, which document his music library collection, his original compositions, teaching career, and his days in the U.S. Army, and which include scores, photographs, sound recordings, are held at the University Library at California State University, Northridge.

References

External links
 Vicente Gómez recordings at the Discography of American Historical Recordings.

1911 births
2001 deaths
20th-century Spanish musicians
Composers for the classical guitar
Musicians from Madrid
Spanish guitarists
Spanish male guitarists
20th-century guitarists
20th-century Spanish male musicians
United States Army personnel of World War II
Spanish emigrants to the United States